Gabapentinoids, also known as α2δ ligands, are a class of drugs that are derivatives of the inhibitory neurotransmitter gamma-Aminobutyric acid (GABA) (i.e., GABA analogues) which block α2δ subunit-containing voltage-dependent calcium channels (VDCCs). This site has been referred to as the gabapentin receptor (α2δ subunit), as it is the target of the drugs gabapentin and pregabalin.

Clinically used gabapentinoids include gabapentin, pregabalin, and mirogabalin, as well as a gabapentin prodrug, gabapentin enacarbil. Additionally, phenibut has been found to act as a gabapentinoid in addition to its action of functioning as a GABAB receptor agonist. Further analogues like imagabalin are in clinical trials but have not yet been approved. Other gabapentinoids which are used in scientific research but have not been approved for medical use include atagabalin, 4-methylpregabalin and PD-217,014.

Medical uses
Gabapentinoids are approved for the treatment of epilepsy, postherpetic neuralgia, neuropathic pain associated with diabetic neuropathy, fibromyalgia, generalized anxiety disorder, and restless legs syndrome. Some off-label uses of gabapentinoids include the treatment of insomnia, migraine, social phobia, panic disorder, mania, bipolar disorder, and alcohol withdrawal. Existing evidence on the use of gabapentinoids in chronic lower back pain is limited, and demonstrates significant risk of adverse effects, without any demonstrated benefit. The main side-effects include: a feeling of sleepiness and tiredness, decreased blood pressure, nausea, vomiting and also glaucomatous visual hallucinations.

Side effects

Pharmacology

Pharmacodynamics
Gabapentinoids are ligands of the auxiliary α2δ subunit site of certain , and thereby act as inhibitors of α2δ subunit-containing VDCCs. There are two drug-binding α2δ subunits, α2δ-1 and α2δ-2, and the gabapentinoids show similar affinity for (and hence lack of selectivity between) these two sites. The gabapentinoids are selective in their binding to the α2δ VDCC subunit. However, phenibut uniquely also binds to and acts as an agonist of the GABAB receptor with lower affinity (~5- to 10-fold in one study). Despite the fact that gabapentinoids are GABA analogues, gabapentin and pregabalin do not bind to the GABA receptors, do not convert into  or GABA receptor agonists in vivo, and do not modulate GABA transport or metabolism. There is currently no evidence that the relevant actions of gabapentin and pregabalin are mediated by any mechanism other than inhibition of α2δ-containing VDCCs. Although, gabapentinoids such as gabapentin, but not pregabalin, have been found to activate Kv voltage-gated potassium channels (KCNQ).

The endogenous α-amino acids L-leucine and L-isoleucine, which closely resemble the gabapentinoids in chemical structure, are apparent ligands of the α2δ VDCC subunit with similar affinity as gabapentin and pregabalin (e.g., IC50 = 71 nM for L-isoleucine), and are present in human cerebrospinal fluid at micromolar concentrations (e.g., 12.9 μM for L-leucine, 4.8 μM for L-isoleucine). It has been hypothesized that they may be the endogenous ligands of the subunit and that they may competitively antagonize the effects of gabapentinoids. In accordance, while gabapentin and pregabalin have nanomolar affinities for the α2δ subunit, their potencies in vivo are in the low micromolar range, and competition for binding by endogenous L-amino acids has been said to likely be responsible for this discrepancy.

In one study, the affinity (Ki) values of gabapentinoids for the α2δ subunit expressed in rat brain were found to be 0.05 μM for gabapentin, 23 μM for (R)-phenibut, 39 μM for (S)-phenibut, and 156 μM for baclofen. Their affinities (Ki) for the GABAB receptor were >1 mM for gabapentin, 92 μM for (R)-phenibut, >1 mM for (S)-phenibut, and 6 μM for baclofen. Based on the low affinity of baclofen for the α2δ subunit relative to the GABAB (26-fold difference), its affinity for the α2δ subunit is unlikely to be of pharmacological importance.

Pregabalin has demonstrated significantly greater potency (about 2.5-fold) than gabapentin in clinical studies.

Pharmacokinetics

Absorption
Gabapentin and pregabalin are absorbed from the intestines by an active transport process mediated via the large neutral amino acid transporter 1 (LAT1, SLC7A5), a transporter for amino acids such as L-leucine and L-phenylalanine. Very few (less than 10 drugs) are known to be transported by this transporter. Unlike gabapentin, which is transported solely by the LAT1, pregabalin seems to be transported not only by the LAT1 but also by other carriers. The LAT1 is easily saturable, so the pharmacokinetics of gabapentin are dose-dependent, with diminished bioavailability and delayed peak levels at higher doses. Conversely, this is not the case for pregabalin, which shows linear pharmacokinetics and no saturation of absorption. Similarly, gabapentin enacarbil is transported not by the LAT1 but by the monocarboxylate transporter 1 (MCT1) and the sodium-dependent multivitamin transporter (SMVT), and no saturation of bioavailability has been observed with the drug up to a dose of 2,800 mg. Similarly to gabapentin and pregabalin, baclofen, a close analogue of phenibut (baclofen specifically being 4-chlorophenibut), is transported by the LAT1, although it is a relatively weak substrate for the transporter.

The oral bioavailability of gabapentin is approximately 80% at 100 mg administered three times daily once every 8 hours, but decreases to 60% at 300 mg, 47% at 400 mg, 34% at 800 mg, 33% at 1,200 mg, and 27% at 1,600 mg, all with the same dosing schedule. Conversely, the oral bioavailability of pregabalin is greater than or equal to 90% across and beyond its entire clinical dose range (75 to 900 mg/day). Food does not significantly influence the oral bioavailability of pregabalin. Conversely, food increases the area-under-curve levels of gabapentin by about 10%. Drugs that increase the transit time of gabapentin in the small intestine can increase its oral bioavailability; when gabapentin was co-administered with oral morphine (which slows intestinal peristalsis), the oral bioavailability of a 600 mg dose of gabapentin increased by 50%. The oral bioavailability of gabapentin enacarbil (as gabapentin) is greater than or equal to 68%, across all doses assessed (up to 2,800 mg), with a mean of approximately 75%. In contrast to the other gabapentinoids, the pharmacokinetics of phenibut have been little-studied, and its oral bioavailability is unknown. However, it would appear to be at least 63% at a single dose of 250 mg, based on the fact that this fraction of phenibut was recovered from the urine unchanged in healthy volunteers administered this dose.

Gabapentin at a low dose of 100 mg has a Tmax (time to peak levels) of approximately 1.7 hours, while the Tmax increases to 3 to 4 hours at higher doses. The Tmax of pregabalin is generally less than or equal to 1 hour at doses of 300 mg or less. However, food has been found to substantially delay the absorption of pregabalin and to significantly reduce peak levels without affecting the bioavailability of the drug; Tmax values for pregabalin of 0.6 hours in a fasted state and 3.2 hours in a fed state (5-fold difference), and the Cmax is reduced by 25–31% in a fed versus fasted state. In contrast to pregabalin, food does not significantly affect the Tmax of gabapentin and increases the Cmax of gabapentin by approximately 10%. The Tmax of the instant-release (IR) formulation of gabapentin enacarbil (as active gabapentin) is about 2.1 to 2.6 hours across all doses (350–2,800 mg) with single administration and 1.6 to 1.9 hours across all doses (350–2,100 mg) with repeated administration. Conversely, the Tmax of the extended-release (XR) formulation of gabapentin enacarbil is about 5.1 hours at a single dose of 1,200 mg in a fasted state and 8.4 hours at a single dose of 1,200 mg in a fed state. The Tmax of phenibut has not been reported, but the onset of action and peak effects have been described as occurring at 2 to 4 hours and 5 to 6 hours, respectively, after oral ingestion in recreational users taking high doses (1–3 g).

Distribution
Gabapentin, pregabalin, and phenibut all cross the blood–brain barrier and enter the central nervous system. However, due to their low lipophilicity, the gabapentinoids require active transport across the blood–brain barrier. The LAT1 is highly expressed at the blood–brain barrier and transports the gabapentinoids that bind to it across into the brain. As with intestinal absorption of gabapentin mediated by LAT1, transport of gabapentin across the blood–brain barrier by LAT1 is saturable. Gabapentin does not bind to other drug transporters such as P-glycoprotein (ABCB1) or OCTN2 (SLC22A5).

Gabapentin and pregabalin are not significantly bound to plasma proteins (<1%). The phenibut analogue baclofen shows low plasma protein binding of 30%.

Metabolism
Gabapentin, pregabalin, and phenibut all undergo little or no metabolism. Conversely, gabapentin enacarbil, which acts as a prodrug of gabapentin, must undergo enzymatic hydrolysis to become active. This is done via non-specific esterases in the intestines and to a lesser extent in the liver.

Elimination
Gabapentin, pregabalin, and phenibut are all eliminated renally in the urine. They all have relatively short elimination half-lives, with reported values of 5.0 to 7.0 hours, 6.3 hours, and 5.3 hours, respectively. Similarly, the terminal half-life of gabapentin enacarbil IR (as active gabapentin) is short at approximately 4.5 to 6.5 hours. The elimination half-life of gabapentin has been found to be extended with increasing doses; in one series of studies, it was 5.4 hours for 200 mg, 6.7 hours for 400 mg, 7.3 hours for 800 mg, 9.3 hours for 1,200 mg, and 8.3 hours for 1,400 mg, all given in single doses. Because of its short elimination half-life, gabapentin must be administered 3 to 4 times per day to maintain therapeutic levels. Similarly, pregabalin has been given 2 to 3 times per day in clinical studies. Phenibut, also, is taken 3 times per day. Conversely, gabapentin enacarbil is taken twice a day and gabapentin XR (brand name Gralise) is taken once a day.

Chemistry

The gabapentinoids are 3-substituted derivatives of GABA; hence, they are GABA analogues, as well as γ-amino acids. Specifically, pregabalin is (S)-(+)-3-isobutyl-GABA, phenibut is 3-phenyl-GABA, and gabapentin is a derivative of GABA with a cyclohexane ring at the 3 position (or, somewhat inappropriately named, 3-cyclohexyl-GABA). The gabapentinoids also closely resemble the α-amino acids L-leucine and L-isoleucine, and this may be of greater relevance in relation to their pharmacodynamics than their structural similarity to GABA.

History
Gabapentin, under the brand name Neurontin, was first approved in May 1993 for the treatment of epilepsy in the United Kingdom, and was marketed in the United States in 1994. Subsequently, gabapentin was approved in the United States for the treatment of postherpetic neuralgia in May 2002. A generic version of gabapentin first became available in the United States in 2004. An extended-release formulation of gabapentin for once-daily administration, under the brand name Gralise, was approved in the United States for the treatment postherpetic neuralgia in January 2011.

Pregabalin, under the brand name Lyrica, was approved in Europe in 2004 and was introduced in the United States in September 2005 for the treatment of epilepsy, postherpetic neuralgia, and neuropathic pain associated with diabetic neuropathy. It was subsequently approved for the treatment of fibromyalgia in the United States in June 2007. Pregabalin was also approved for the treatment of generalized anxiety disorder in Europe in 2005, though it has not been approved for this indication in the United States.

Gabapentin enacarbil, under the brand name Horizant, was introduced in the United States for the treatment of restless legs syndrome in April 2011 and was approved for the treatment of postherpetic neuralgia in June 2012. 

Phenibut, marketed under the brand names Anvifen, Fenibut, and Noofen, was introduced in Russia in the 1960s for the treatment of anxiety, insomnia, and a variety of other conditions. It was not discovered to act as a gabapentinoid until 2015.

Baclofen marketed under the brandname of Lioresal was introduced in the United States in 1977 for the treatment of spasticity  is chemically similar to phenibut but is usually not considered a gabapentinoid
Mirogabalin, under the brand name Tarlige, was approved for the treatment of neuropathic pain and postherpetic neuralgia in Japan in January 2019.

Society and culture

Recreational use
Gabapentinoids produce euphoria at high doses, with effects similar to GABAergic central nervous system depressants such as alcohol, γ-hydroxybutyric acid (GHB), and benzodiazepines, and are used as recreational drugs (at 3–20 times typical clinical doses). The overall abuse potential is considered to be low and notably lower than that of other drugs such as alcohol, benzodiazepines, opioids, psychostimulants, and other illicit drugs. In any case, due to its recreational potential, pregabalin is a schedule V controlled substance in the United States. In April 2019, the United Kingdom scheduled gabapentin and pregabalin as Class C drugs under the Misuse of Drugs Act 1971, and as Schedule 3 under the Misuse of Drugs Regulations 2001.  However, it is not a controlled substance in Canada, or Australia, and the other gabapentinoids, including phenibut, are not controlled substances either. As such, they are mostly legal intoxicants.

Tolerance to gabapentinoids is reported to develop very rapidly with repeated use, although to also dissipate quickly upon discontinuation, and withdrawal symptoms such as insomnia, nausea, headache, and diarrhea have been reported. More severe withdrawal symptoms, such as severe rebound anxiety, have been reported with phenibut. Because of the rapid tolerance with gabapentinoids, users often escalate their doses, while other users may space out their doses and use sparingly to avoid tolerance.

List of agents

Approved
 Gabapentin (Neurontin, Gabagamma)
 Gabapentin extended-release (Gralise)
 Gabapentin enacarbil (Horizant)
 Mirogabalin (Tarlige)
 Phenibut (Anvifen, Fenibut, Noofen)
 Pregabalin (Lyrica)

Not approved
 4-Fluorophenibut
 4-Methylpregabalin
 Atagabalin (PD-200,390)
 Imagabalin
 PD-217,014
 Tolibut

References

Further reading
 

Amino acids
Analgesics
Anticonvulsants
Anxiolytics
Calcium channel blockers
Euphoriants
GABA analogues